Highcliffe School is a co-educational secondary school and sixth form located in Highcliffe-on-Sea (near Christchurch) in the English county of Dorset.

Features
The school has a £4,000,000 technology block, ICT and science departments, and plasma TV screens all around the school for displaying messages and announcements.

Building work has finished on a fitness suite, which PE students have access to, containing fitness training machines and weights.

The school Music Department has access to a technology room, which contains computers loaded with Cubase music programs and Sibelius software (a score-writing program). It also features keyboards connected to these computers, acting as speakers and MIDI-input devices.

Specialism
Highcliffe School specialises in languages, and teaches:
Japanese (as an optional extra curricular subject)
Spanish
French
Chinese (as an optional extra curricular subject)
Latin (as an optional extracurricular subject)

The school also offers "twilight lessons" for parents and other adults to learn languages after normal school hours.

External links
Official website

Secondary schools in Bournemouth, Christchurch and Poole
Academies in Bournemouth, Christchurch and Poole